The Woolstore Precinct is a residential area in the suburb of Teneriffe in Brisbane, Australia. A former industrial and commercial area, it has undergone urban renewal with preservation and re-purposing of many buildings from the early 20th century. This renewal has been guided by neighbourhood plans formulated by Brisbane City Council, with advice from the Queensland Heritage Council.

Location and characteristics

Located within the suburb of Teneriffe, Queensland, the Woolstore Precinct is the riverfront area bounded by Wyandra Street (from riverfront to no. 55 Wyandra St) and Commercial Road (including the Skyring Terrace side of Helen Street and Commercial Road) at the north, Florence Street at the west, running down along southern part of Chermside Street, including Macquarie Street and up to Hasting Street at the south. (See Precinct Map)

The Woolstore Precinct is characterised by its many historical wool stores and other industrial structures erected in the beginning of the 20th century. Once dominated by wharves, wool stores and factories, the area has been gradually transformed into a medium-high density residential community starting from the early 1990s. By preserving its distinctive industrial heritage, together with the addition of upmarket apartments, parks, boardwalks, retailing and business premises that promotes riverfront lifestyle, the Woolstore Precinct is today one of the most sought-after addresses in the inner city suburbs of Brisbane.

Driving force

The transformation of the inner city suburbs has been largely driven by the rapidly increasing concentration of business services, education and health services in the Central Business District (CBD) and the nearby business districts such as Southbank, Milton, Herston, Toowong, Indooroopilly and St Lucia. Professionals, managers and overseas students are attracted by the inner-city living lifestyle Housing market in suburbs surrounding the CBD thus experienced increasing pressure. It is projected that 138,000 new in-fill dwellings are needed by year 2031 in order to satisfy the rapid growth.

Through the urban renewal projects, Newstead & Teneriffe region, including the historical Woolstore Precinct, has been able to contribute to the housing market by increasing its dwelling number from 440 (1991) to 3500 (2006). This number is expected to grow to 8700 dwellings in 2031.

Agencies
Governments at all levels have been active in encouraging urban consolidation. This is seen in various forms, including Brisbane City Council encouraging in-fill housing development, and the master-planned redevelopment of the inner north-eastern suburbs led by the Urban Renewal Task Force.

Urban Renewal Brisbane (URB)
In the late 1980s Brisbane's inner-city areas were struggling with economic stagnation, urban decay and crime which resulted in an exodus of residents and business to the suburban fringe. Established in 1991 as the Urban Renewal Taskforce, URB was responsible for revitalising derelict industrial areas in inner north-east suburbs of Fortitude Valley, New Farm, Teneriffe, Newstead and Bowen Hills.

URB responses to the challenges of rapidly growing demand of inner city dwelling in a sustainable manner. By focussing growth in urban renewal area, close to public transport and other services, existing infrastructure is used more efficiently and natural areas on the fringe of the city are protected from growth. Carefully planning and design also allows valued heritage and character area to be protected alongside contemporary architecture to strengthen the identity of the local neighbourhoods.

Over the years, several master plans have been adopted to facilitate the redevelopment and maintenance of the area. These include:
 Newstead and Teneriffe Master Plan
 Inner North Eastern Suburbs Master Plan
 Newstead and Teneriffe Waterfront and Teneriffe Hill Local Area Plans
 New Farm, Teneriffe and Newstead Riverside Promenade Master Plan
 Newstead and Teneriffe Waterfront Neighbourhood Plan

Newstead and Teneriffe Waterfront Neighbourhood Plan is a local plan under the Brisbane City Plan 2000. Effective from 2011, this plan contains specific additional local planning requirements for the Newstead and Teneriffe waterfront area. Development principles include conserving and reusing historical buildings for a range of activities.

Under the masterplan, the Woolstore Precinct will continue to primarily accommodate mid-rise multi-unit dwellings and detached residential dwelling, along with small shops, offices and restaurants at ground level. Existing buildings of heritage significance are retained, and new buildings nearby are complementary to their scale, character and setting, maintaining the dominance of the former Woolstores and other historical structures and preserving the amenity of these area.

Queensland Heritage Council
Established by the Queensland Heritage Act in 1992, the Queensland Heritage Council also helps identify and protect the heritage buildings in the Woolstore Precinct. The agency provides strategic advice to the preservation and management of the historical buildings. Nine Woolstores buildings and two other historical structures within the Woolstore Precinct have been listed in the Queensland Heritage Register.

Four additional structures within the precinct were identified as of heritage importance in the Brisbane City Council's City Plan Heritage Register Database, and are thus preserved and maintained in the new environment.

Private sectors
The private sectors have been very responsive to the urban renewal schemes in the Woolstore Precinct. Industrial sites and old warehouses were taken up rapidly by property developers at the announcement of URB's strategies in the mid-1990s. Architects were engaged in the refurbishment of existing buildings and development of new sites to ensure all the master plan was strictly adhered to and interventions appropriately implemented. (See List below for details)

Public reception
Although some concerns of displacement have been expressed, the redevelopment of the Woolstore Precinct is generally well received by old and new residents. The new apartments has been popular with young professionals, older 'empty nesters' and interstate migrants, with over 50% of all dwellings being rental properties. Annual rental and capital growth of the property market continue to be healthy in the past years, indicating the high popularity of the area.

2011 Brisbane flood in Woolstore Precinct
Although the Woolstore Precinct is situated close to the Brisbane River, the severe flood that occurred in 2011 did not cause any major damage to the buildings in the precinct. Even though in the nearby suburb of New Farm a considerable amount of residence and commercial area was inundated during the river surge (and by stormwater backing up drains), only parts of the riverside walkways in the Woolstore Precinct were flooded. All buildings and the major roads of Macquarie Street, Vernon Terrace and Skyring Terrace within the boundary of Woolstore Precinct were located high enough from the highest water level recorded and thus were safe from the flood. River debris were washed up at the end of Commercial Road near the Teneriffe Ferry and also on the walkway outside Eve Restaurant. The Nouvelle Apartments on Skyring Terrace reported some drain backflow problem but was not severe.
Some residences at the northern end of the Vernon Terrace and Skyring Terrace suffered electricity loss for a variable period during the flood.

List of buildings in the Woolstore Precinct Urban Renewal projects

References

External links
 Nearmap. Flood map of Brisbane on 13th Jan 2011. http://www.nearmap.com/?ll=-27.468907,153.025475&z=14&t=h&nmd=20110113

Buildings and structures in Brisbane